Kazuma Tomoto (戸本一真, born 5 June 1983) is a Japanese equestrian. He competed in eventing at the 2020 Summer Olympics, placing fourth in the individual competition. He represented Japan in showjumping until 2015, before switching focus to eventing.

References

External links
 

1983 births
Living people
Japanese male equestrians
Olympic equestrians of Japan
Equestrians at the 2020 Summer Olympics
Place of birth missing (living people)
Event riders